This article is a list of notable people who were born in and/or have lived in Manhattan, Kansas.  Alumni of local universities, including athletes and coaches, that are not originally from Manhattan should not be included in this list; instead, they should be listed in the alumni list article for each university.

Academics
 Helen Brockman, fashion design professor
 Stephen S. Chang, food scientist
 May Louise Cowles, early advocate of teaching home economics
 Kenneth S. Davis, historian and university professor, most renowned for his series of biographies of Franklin Delano Roosevelt.
 Milton S. Eisenhower, former president of Kansas State University and brother to Dwight D. Eisenhower
 David Fairchild, botanist, explorer
 Philip Fox, astronomer
 Solon Toothaker Kimball, educator and anthropologist
Jennifer Lippincott-Schwartz, cell biologist and neuroscientist
 Abby Lillian Marlatt, noted educator
 George A. Milliken, statistician
 Benjamin Franklin Mudge, geologist
 Merrill D. Peterson, historian
 Luraine Tansey, librarian who developed a universal slide classification scheme
 Virginia Trotter, education administrator
 Samuel Wendell Williston, scientist
 Robert A. Woodruff, space instrumentation scientist

Arts and entertainment

 Dawayne Bailey, composer, guitarist, and vocalist; formerly of Bob Seger's Silver Bullet Band and Chicago
 Bill Buzenberg, journalist, executive director of Center for Public Integrity, former vice-president of news at NPR
 Elizabeth Williams Champney, author
 Louis Chaudet, film director, writer
 Del Close, comedian
 Brian Doyle-Murray, actor, scriptwriter
 Bridget Everett, cabaret artist, comedian
 Jonathan Holden, first Poet Laureate of Kansas
 Lee Killough, author
 Charles Melton, actor and model
 Tom Oberheim, inventor of Oberheim synthesizer and DMX drum machine
 Mitsugi Ohno, glassblower
 Clementine Paddleford, food critic
 Cassandra Peterson, actress and model, best known as "Elvira, Mistress of the Dark"
 A.J. Rathbun, renowned mixologist
 Damon Runyon, author
 Inger Stevens, Swedish-American movie and TV actress
 Eric Stonestreet, actor, notable for his Emmy-winning role on the ABC comedy Modern Family
 Laura Zabel, arts advocate

Athletics

See also List of Kansas State Wildcats head football coaches and List of Kansas State Wildcats in the NFL Draft
 Bob Anderson, founder of Runner's World
 Jeremy Bates, quarterback coach for the Chicago Bears
 Tom Brosius, track and field athlete
Jackie Carmichael (born 1990), basketball player
 Jim Colbert, professional golfer
 Bobby Douglass, former National Football League player
 Brian Giles, former Major League Baseball player
 Larry Hartshorn, NFL player for the Chicago Cardinals
 Tim Jankovich, college basketball coach
 Lon Kruger, college and professional basketball coach
 Scott Liebler, former Atlantic Championship racing driver
 Jon McGraw, NFL player for the New York Jets
 Travis Metcalf, professional baseball player
 Jordy Nelson, NFL player for the Green Bay Packers
 Tim Norris, golf coach and former professional golfer
 Bert Pearson, NFL player for the Chicago Bears
 Vince Rafferty, NFL player
 Thomas Randolph, All-American football player
 Deb Richard, professional golfer
 Ann Roniger, American athlete, high jumper, pentathlete
 Bill Snyder, NCAA football head football coach at Kansas State University
 Gary Spani, Kansas City Chiefs franchise Hall of Fame

Military
 John Byers Anderson, military officer, businessman, president of the First National Bank of Manhattan
 Frank Coe, major general in United States Army
 James Harbord, military officer, businessman
 Richard Jaccard, United States Navy pilot
 Earl Woods, father of Tiger Woods

Politics

 John Alexander Anderson, U.S. Congressman 
 John W. Carlin, 40th governor of Kansas
 Sydney Carlin, member of the Kansas House of Representatives
 Walter C. Dunton, member of the Kansas Territorial Legislature, Justice of the Vermont Supreme Court
 Joan Finney, 42nd governor of Kansas
 Nehemiah Green, 4th governor of Kansas
 Tom Hawk, member of the Kansas House of Representatives
 Martha Keys, U.S. Congressperson
 Albert E. Mead, 5th governor of Washington
 Jerry Moran, member of the United States Senate
 Frank B. Morrison, 34th governor of Nebraska
 Susan Mosier, member of the Kansas House of Representatives
 Tom Phillips, member of the Kansas House of Representatives
 Roger Reitz, member of the Kansas Senate
 Fred Andrew Seaton, Senator for Nebraska and Secretary of the Interior
 Walter J. Stoessel, diplomat

Other
 Alice Stebbins Wells, first American-born policewoman in the U.S.

See also

 List of Kansas State University people
 Lists of people from Kansas

References

Further reading

Manhattan, Kansas
Manhattan